The Victorian Periodicals Review is a peer-reviewed academic journal established in 1968, under the editorship of Michael Wolff and Dorothy Deering, as the Victorian Periodical Newsletter. It obtained its current name in 1979. The journal covers the editorial and publishing history of periodicals from the Victorian era. It is the official journal of the Research Society for Victorian Periodicals. The journal is published quarterly by the Johns Hopkins University Press.

External links 
 
 Victorian Periodicals Review at Project MUSE
 Research Society for Victorian Periodicals

Literary magazines published in the United States
History journals
Publications established in 1968
Johns Hopkins University Press academic journals
English-language journals
Quarterly journals
Victorian era